Fc fragment of IgM receptor is a protein that in humans is encoded by the FCMR gene.

Function

Fc receptors specifically bind to the Fc region of immunoglobulins (Igs) to mediate the unique functions of each Ig class. FAIM3 encodes an Fc receptor for IgM (see MIM 147020) (Kubagawa et al., 2009 [PubMed 19858324]; Shima et al., 2010 [PubMed 20042454]).

References

Further reading 

Human proteins